Arno und die Morgencrew (English: Arno and the Morning Crew) is the morning show of the Berlin radio station 104.6 RTL.  It broadcasts weekdays from 5:00 – 10:00 in the morning.  Each Saturday, a summary of the week follows in a “best-of” show from 8:00 – 10:00 in the morning.  The host of the show is Arno Müller, who is also the director of programming of 104.6 RTL.  His co-host has been Katja Desens since 1995.

History 
Arno und die Morgencrew is a morning show in the same vein as American morning radio shows, with a lot of comedy and multiple hosts, sidekicks, traffic pilots, sweepstakes, listener participation, as well as promotions, like “Smash Your Bathroom” or “Ex or Marriage”.

Within nine months, the show became the leader in listeners in the Berlin market according to the German Media-Analyse, and pointed the way for the German radio scene.  Arno und die Morgencrew is one of the most copied shows in Germany.

Once a year, Arno und die Morgencrew broadcasts from Majorca.  Other overseas broadcasts were made from Los Angeles, Hong Kong, Greece, Dubai, Turkey, and Thailand.

Comedies and categories 
 Burhan Yilmaz (Crazy phone)
 Der kleine Nils (English: Little Nils) (Crazy phone)
 Opa Kurt (English: Grandpa Kurt) (Crazy phone)
 Jürgen Kerbel (Crazy phone)
 Marie aus Paris (English: Marie from Paris) (Crazy phone)
 Phillip von Senftleben – the world champion of flirting
 Supermerkel
 Daily Wowi
 Unrequested demand
 Agathe Bauer Songs
 365 things that you must have done in Berlin and Brandenburg before you die
 Crew vs. You
 The Morning Crew on hold
 Christmas wishes
 Battle of the Sexes
 From 0 to 100
 Loyalty test
 Bavaria wakes up

Awards 
 1993/1994 Research Group Samurai Award on the NAB in Los Angeles, Arno Müller
 1993 Bild Newspaper “Radio Man of the Year”, Arno Müller
 2005 German Radio Award, The Best German Morning Show
 2008 Radio Award, Agathe Bauer Songs
 2008 Radio Award, Ausbildung für alle (English:Education for All)
 2011 Golden Lion, 20 Years at RTL, Arno Müller
 2012 German Radio Award, Life’s Work in Hosting, Arno Müller

References 
All of the content of this article comes from the equivalent German-language Wikipedia article (see "Deutsch" link in the language list). Retrieved on February 26, 2014. The following references are cited by that German-language article:

German radio programs